Château de Sauvebœuf may refer to:
 Château de Sauvebœuf (Aubas), a château in Dordogne, Aquitane, France
 Château de Sauvebœuf (Lalinde), a château in Dordogne, Aquitane, France